Scotto is a given name and a surname (the patronymic is Scotti), generally Italian, and may refer to:
 Scotto, a 13th-century troubadour
 Anthony M. Scotto (born 1934), American mobster
 Aubrey Scotto (1895–1953), American film director
 Daniel Scotto, American financial analyst
 Girolamo Scotto (c.1505 – 1572), Venetian music printer and composer
 Renata Scotto (born 1934), Italian soprano
 Rosanna Scotto, American news anchor
 Vincent Scotto (1876–1952), French composer
It is also the nickname of:
 Scott Allen Miller, American talk radio personality

See also
 Scotton
 Scottown